California's state elections were held November 7, 2000. Necessary primary elections were held on March 7. Up for election were all the seats of the State Assembly, 20 seats of the State Senate, and eight ballot measures.

California State Legislature elections

State Senate

There are 40 seats in the State Senate. For this election, candidates running in odd-numbered districts ran for four-year terms.

State Assembly

All 80 biennially elected seats of the State Assembly were up for election this year. Each seat has a two-year term. The Democrats retained control of the State Assembly.

Statewide ballot propositions
Eight ballot propositions qualified to be listed on the general election ballot in California. Five measures passed while three failed.

Proposition 32
Proposition 32 would provide for a bond of $500 million for farm and home aid for California veterans. Proposition 32 passed with 67.2% approval.

Proposition 33
Proposition 33 would amend the constitution to allow members of the State Legislature to participate in the Public Employees' Retirement System plans in which a majority of state employees may participate. Proposition 33 failed with 39% approval.

Proposition 34
Proposition 34 would limit campaign contributions and loans to state candidates and political parties, provide voluntary spending limits, expand public disclosure requirements, and increase penalties. Proposition 34 passed with 60% approval.

Proposition 35
Proposition 35 would amend the constitution to eliminate existing restrictions on state and local contracting with private entities for engineering and architectural services. Contracts would be awarded by competitive selection, and bidding would be allowed, but not required. Proposition 35 passed with 55.1% approval.

Proposition 36
Proposition 36 would require probation and drug treatment, not incarceration, for possession, use, transportation of controlled substances and similar parole violations, except sale or manufacture; and would authorize dismissal of charges after completion of treatment. Proposition 36 passed with 60.8% approval.

Proposition 37
Proposition 37 would amend the constitution to require a two-thirds vote of the State Legislature and a majority or two-thirds of the local electorate to impose future state and local fees on activity to study or mitigate its environmental, societal or economic effects. Proposition 37 failed with 48% approval.

Proposition 38
Proposition 38 would amend the constitution to authorize annual state payments of at least $4000 per pupil for private/religious schools, and allow replacement of current constitutional public school funding formula. Proposition 38 failed with 29.5% approval.

Proposition 39
Proposition 39 would authorize bonds for repair, construction or replacement of school facilities and classrooms, if approved by 55% of the local vote. Proposition 39 passed with 53.3% approval.

See also
California State Legislature
California State Assembly
California State Assembly elections, 2000
California State Senate
California State Senate elections, 2000
Districts in California
Political party strength in U.S. states
Political party strength in California
Elections in California

References

External links
"A directory of California state propositions"
Official election results form the California Secretary of State
California Legislative District Maps (1911-Present)
RAND California Election Returns: District Definitions

 
California